Dig It is the thirteenth album by Klaus Schulze. It was originally released in 1980, and in 2005 was the sixth Schulze album reissued by Revisited Records. It is Schulze's first fully digital recording. The 2005 reissue includes a bonus DVD with the video recording of the 1980 performance at Ars Electronica, which was previously released as audio on The Ultimate Edition (2000).

The opening track, "Death of an Analogue", would later find use as the main theme to the 1982 Australian horror film Next of Kin, starring Jacki Kerin and John Jarratt.

Track listing
All tracks composed by Klaus Schulze.

Disc 1 (CD)

Disc 2 (DVD)

Personnel
Klaus Schulze – synthesizer, guitar, drums, keyboards, vocals, engineer, computers
Fred Severloh – drums

References

External links
 Dig It at the official site of Klaus Schulze
 

Klaus Schulze albums
1980 albums